Ner Ethir is a 2014 Indian Tamil-language thriller film directed by M. Jayapradeep and produced by Kalaipuli S. Thanu. The film stars Parthy, Richard, and Vidhya Mohan, while Harish Siva, Aishwarya Menon, and M. S. Bhaskar play supporting roles. The music was composed by Satish Chakravarthy with cinematography by Rasamathi and editing by Gopi Krishna. The film released worldwide on 24 January 2014. It is a remake of Across the Hall.

Plot 
Karthik (Richard) gets a call from his friend Kathir (Parthy), who explains to him that earlier that day, he received a call that his fiancée Isha (Vidhya Mohan) has cancelled her flight. Kathir had followed her and discovered that she had checked out a room in a local hotel, after which Kathir rents out the room across the hall from Isha, believing that she is cheating on him. Kathir explains to Karthik that earlier that evening, he had gone to Karthik's house, and finding him not home, broke in and stole Karthik's gun. Worried that Kathir is about to kill someone, Karthik tries to reason with Kathir on the phone not to do anything, but after having no success, he tells Kathir to stay where he is and wait until he meets him at the hotel in about 20 minutes. During the film, it is revealed that Isha had canceled her flight because of Karthik and that they were cheating behind Kathir's back. Kathir finds this out when he kills Isha and tries to call Karthik, whose cell phone was still in the hotel room that Isha and Karthik cheated in. Kathir tricks Karthik into helping move Isha and frames him for killing her while the police storms the hotel.

Cast 
Parthy as Kathir
Richard as Karthik
Vidhya Mohan as Isha
Harish Siva as Kathiresan
Aishwarya Menon as Nethra
M. S. Bhaskar as Neeraavi
Halwa Vasu
Kausha Rach as item number

Production 
The film began production in late March 2013, with Richard revealing that he would play the lead role in the murder mystery film Woo, directed by Jayapradeep, an associate of director Keyaar. In April 2013, the team discussed filming a romantic song in Norway and Switzerland, citing that schedules had already taken place on a set worth 75 lakh rupees. Later that month, the team had a legal tussle with the maker of the film Vu for using a similar title. Subsequently, the producers had to change the name from Woo to Ner Ethir.

In late 2013, producer S. Thanu, who usually finances big budget films, chose to back the venture which featured mostly newcomers and revealed that all profits from the film would be distributed to the welfare of the needy in the film industry. He also revealed discussed potential Telugu and Hindi remake versions of the film with director Gautham Vasudev Menon.

Soundtrack 
The music was composed by Satish Chakravarthy.

References

External links 
 

2010s Tamil-language films
2014 films
Indian remakes of American films